Epping Road is a  arterial road located on the North Shore of Sydney, New South Wales, Australia.

Route

History 
Epping Road was originally constructed in the late 1930s as an entirely-new road, in contrast to most other main roads in Sydney, which had routes originally established in the early 19th century. The road was divided by a beautiful centre strip that was so wide that people would park and picnic there. It was designated as State Route 28 from 1974 to 1993 and then Metroad 2 from November 1993 until May 1997, when Metroad 2 was moved onto the M2 motorway. A short stretch of Metroad 2 remained on Epping Road in the Lane Cove area until March 2007, when the Lane Cove Tunnel opened.

In the 1960s and 1970s, Epping Road was further reconstructed as a mostly six lane arterial road, a major road project which lasted more than 10 years and involved the widening of the bridges at Lane Cove River and Stringybark Creek to six lanes. As vehicle use increased traffic congestion increased.

North-west of the Lane Cove River, the M2 Hills Motorway, a tollway which opened in May 1997 and diverges from Epping Road, bypassing North Ryde and Epping. It is part of the Sydney Orbital Network and carries most long-distance road traffic which previously used Epping Road. However Epping Road remains a busy road.

South-east of the Lane Cove River, the Lane Cove Tunnel, a cashless tollway, opened in March 2007 runs beneath Epping Road, bypassing Lane Cove suburb and reducing congestion.

After the opening of the Lane Cove Tunnel, Epping Road, near Lane Cove and Longueville was left intact for a period of 5 months. Then over 7 months that section of road was reconfigured to be:
 Dedicated 24-hour bus lanes in each direction (may also be used by taxis, motor bikes and bicycles)
 A single lane for cars in each direction between Centennial Avenue and Orion Rd both directions, the 2nd lane lost to the aforementioned dedicated bus lane.
 A new bus interchange and pedestrian overbridge on the corner of Longueville Road and Parklands Avenue at Lane Cove
 Right turn lanes reinstated for westbound traffic at Parklands Avenue and Centennial Avenue
 A continuous cycleway on the southern side of Epping Rd

See Changes to Epping Road for more details

These changes were part of the contractual agreement reached between the NSW state government and the developers of the Lane Cove Tunnel, prior to the start of the tunnel's construction.

In mid-2011, work commenced on removing the entire median strip, wire barrier system, and native bushes from the section between Wicks Road and Delhi Road.

See also 

Gore Hill and Epping Road cycleways

References 

Streets in Sydney